Jakhauli is a village of in the city of Sonipat in Hariyana.

According to a census in 2011, there are 1,460 families residing in the village. The total population of the village is 8,259, out of which 4,388 are males and 3,871 are females. Children within the age range 0–6 years constitute 12.87% (1,063) of the total population.

The average sex ratio of Jakhauli village is 882, which is higher than the Haryana state average of 879. On the other hand, the Child Sex Ratio for Jakhauli per the census is 802, which is lower than the Haryana average of 834. The literacy rate of Jakhauli village is 79.60% compared to 75.55% in Haryana. In Jakhauli, male literacy stands at 89%, while the female literacy rate is 69.9%.

Flocks of cattle egret, known as Bagula in Hindi, visit the village annually around June. These birds builds their nests mostly on Acacia karoo (kikar) tree, so that they can get sufficient sunlight for their eggs. They migrate from the village on start of winter season.

References

Villages in Sonipat district